The 1935 Tipperary Senior Hurling Championship was the 45th staging of the Tipperary Senior Hurling Championship since its establishment by the Tipperary County Board in 1887.

Moycarkey-Borris were the defending champions.

Thurles Sarsfields won the championship after a 6–05 to 0–02 defeat of Carrick Swans in the final. It was their ninth championship title overall and their first title since 1929.

References

Tipperary
Tipperary Senior Hurling Championship